Doris Stuart Kngwarreye (c.1940 - ) is the senior traditional owner for Mparntwe (Alice Springs) in the Northern Territory of Australia.

Early life

Stuart was born at Hamilton Downs Station in the early 1940s. Her family has lived alongside the Todd River for countless generations. It was her father’s traditional ground.

She is the Apmereke artweye (traditional owner) and speaks Central Arrernte. Her main Dreamings are Kngwelye (dog) associated with Alhekulyele and Yeperenye, Ntyarlke and Utnerrengatye (caterpillar species).

Advocacy

Stuart is an advocate for the protection of Aboriginal sacred sites and cultural knowledge in the area. She was a key spokeswoman in the Alice Springs native title claim in the 1990s.

She has run sacred site tours around Mparntwe, working with local artists to deepen community understanding of her country.

References

People from Alice Springs
Living people
Year of birth missing (living people)